Kasirye is a Ugandan surname. Notable people with the surname include:

Jamil Kasirye (born 1954), Ugandan football goalkeeper
Ruth Kasirye (born 1982), Norwegian weightlifter

See also
Kasirye Byaruhanga, a Ugandan law firm 

Surnames of African origin